Report of the Royal Commission on Genetic Modification was published in 2001 by the government appointed Royal Commission on Genetic Modification.

Thomas Eichelbaum chaired the Royal Commission on Genetic Modification.

See also
Genetic engineering in New Zealand

External links
Report of the Royal Commission on Genetic Modification - online HTML version

Environment of New Zealand
Environmental reports
New Zealand books
New Zealand
2001 in New Zealand
2001 in the environment